Fernelia buxifolia is a shrub belonging to the family Rubiaceae. It is found in the Mascarene Islands of Mauritius, Réunion, and Rodrigues.

References

External links

 

Octotropideae
Flora of Mauritius
Flora of Réunion
Flora of Rodrigues
Plants described in 1788
Endemic flora of the Mascarene Islands